Taylor Russolino (born May 23, 1989) is an American gridiron football placekicker for the Arlington Renegades of the XFL. He currently holds the record for longest field goal in the XFL (58 yards).

Early life and college career 
A native of Metairie, Louisiana, Russolino did not play football until his senior year of high school. Originally a soccer player, Russolino was approached by the high school football coach and soccer coach to kick for the football team as their normal kicker was playing in a baseball playoff tournament. After participating in a Ray Guy kicking camp, he dropped soccer after receiving advice from NFL kicker John Carney to pursue a football career.

Russolino played college football at Millsaps College at the Division III level, where he was a three-time all-conference selection, and setting multiple kicking records for the program.

Professional career

Early career
Russolino signed his first professional contract with the Marion Blue Racers of the Continental Indoor Football League in 2013. He signed with the New Orleans VooDoo of the Arena Football League in February 2014. He played in three games, going 11-for-18 on extra point attempts and missed his only field goal attempt. He was placed on injured reserve on April 9, 2014.

Russolino signed with the Spokane Empire of the Indoor Football League in March 2016. Russolino was drafted by the Shanghai Skywalkers in the China Arena Football League draft in June 2016. Russolino was named to the All-Pro South Division All-Stars. He was also one of eight players named to the CAFL Fan's Dream Team.

Canadian Football League
Russolino signed with the Montreal Alouettes of the Canadian Football League (CFL) on October 26, 2017, to replace their injured regular kicker Boris Bede. Russolino played in two games, punting 19 times for an average of 38.3yards per punt, and making two of his three field goal attempts. He was released on November 30, 2017.

Russolino signed with the BC Lions of the CFL during training camp on May 18, 2019, and was released before the season on May 30, 2019.

St. Louis BattleHawks 
Russolino was added to the St. Louis BattleHawks' roster in November 2019. While with the BattleHawks, he set the XFL record for longest made field goal, with a 58-yard field goal. While with the BattleHawks, he started a GoFundMe page for front-line workers during the COVID-19 pandemic, a group which his fiancée was a part of. He was named to the 2020 midseason All-XFL team. He had his contract terminated when the league suspended operations on April 10, 2020.

Denver Broncos 
Russolino was signed to the Denver Broncos practice squad on December 7, 2020. He was signed after former punter and XFL broadcaster Pat McAfee recommended him to Broncos special teams coordinator Tom McMahon. Russolino was elevated to the active roster on December 18 for the team's week 15 game against the Buffalo Bills to replace Brandon McManus, who was in COVID-19 protocols, and reverted to the practice squad after the game. Russolino's practice squad contract with the team expired after the season on January 11, 2021.

Arlington Renegades 
On November 17, 2022, Russolino was drafted by the Arlington Renegades of the XFL.

References

External links 
 Taylor Russolino on Twitter
 Millsaps Majors bio

1989 births
Living people
Players of American football from Louisiana
American football placekickers
Millsaps Majors football players
Marion Blue Racers players
New Orleans VooDoo players
Spokane Empire players
Shanghai Skywalkers players
Canadian football placekickers
Canadian football punters
Montreal Alouettes players
BC Lions players
St. Louis BattleHawks players
Denver Broncos players
Arlington Renegades players
People from Metairie, Louisiana